was a Japanese football player. He played for Japan national team.

National team career
In August 1927, when Taki was a Waseda University High School student, he was selected Japan national team for 1927 Far Eastern Championship Games in Shanghai. At this competition, on August 29, he debuted against Philippines and Japan won this match. This is Japan national team's first victory in International A Match.

National team statistics

References

External links
 
 Japan National Football Team Database

Year of birth missing
Year of death missing
Japanese footballers
Japan international footballers
Association football forwards